Pseudaletis arrhon is a butterfly in the family Lycaenidae first described by Hamilton Herbert Druce in 1913. It is found in Cameroon.

References

Endemic fauna of Cameroon
Butterflies described in 1913
Pseudaletis